The Mantion–Meax or (South)East Bird's Head languages are a language family of three languages in the "Bird's Head Peninsula" of western New Guinea, spoken by all together 20,000 people.

Classification
East Bird's Head stock (3 languages)
Mantion (Manikion, Sougb)
Meax family: Meax (Meyah), Meninggo (Moskona)

Pronouns
The pronouns Ross reconstructs for the proto-language (Usher's Southeast Bird's Head) are:

{| class=wikitable style="text-align:center;"
|-
! || colspan="3"| Number
|-
! rowspan="2"| Person || rowspan="2"| Singular || colspan="2"| Plural
|-
! exclusive || inclusive
|-
! 1st
|*da, *di- || *meme, *me- || *mimi, *mi-
|-
! 2nd
| *ba, *bi- || colspan="2"| *ia, *i-
|-
!3rd
| *e, *- || colspan="2"| *rua, *ri-
|}

Basic vocabulary
Lexical similarities among East Bird's Head languages (Meyah, Moskona, Sougb, Hatam, Mansim) listed in Holton & Klamer (2018):

{| 
|+ East Bird's Head family basic vocabulary
! gloss !! Meyah !! Moskona !! Sougb !! Hatam !! Mansim
|-
| ‘bird’ || mem || mem || ba || hab || waw
|-
| ‘louse’ || mej || mej || mem || mem || 
|-
| ‘one’ || egens || erges || hom || gom || wom
|-
| ‘night’ || motu || mot || loba || mmun || 
|-
| ‘I’ || didif || dif || dan || dani || danu
|}

Additional East Bird's Head basic vocabulary quoted by Holton & Klamer (2018) from Miedema & Reesink (2004: 34) and (Reesink 2005: 202), showing diverse non-cognate vocabulary across different branches:

{| 
|+ Additional East Bird's Head basic vocabulary
! gloss !! Meyah !! Moskona !! Sougb !! Hatam
|-
| arm/hand || etma || etma || s(i)ra || ndab
|-
| leg/foot || aki || egak/oko || ohora || mig
|-
| house || mod || mod || tu || ig
|-
| good || oufa || ojfa || eigouh || kei
|-
| dog || mes || mes || mihi || nsien
|-
| pig || mek || mek || hwej || nab
|-
| chicken || mongkukar || memkoar || berougb || guri
|-
| louse || mej || mej || mem || mem
|-
| water/river || mei || mij || uhu || nyei
|-
| banana ||  || meni || nej || wida
|}

The following basic vocabulary words are from Voorhoeve (1975) and Miedema & Welling (1985), as cited in the Trans-New Guinea database:

{| class="wikitable sortable"
! gloss !! Manikion !! Meyah !! Meyah (Akrin dialect) !! Meyah (Mumbrani dialect) !! Meyah (Etskebi dialect) !! Meyah (Miun dialect) !! Meyah (Anason dialect) !! Moskona !! Moskona (Merdey dialect)
|-
! head
| mogt || ibirfa || méwifa || miːfa || méwèr || èwit || iwir || ibre || biwèr
|-
! hair
| mokodi || feji || méwifesi || miːfèsyi || meyfreits || iwirèfes || iwirèreys || feja || biwèrfesyé
|-
! eye
| ma-i resi || itec || yetèts || mitèt || eytet(s) || mèntèt || mèteys || iteja || bitèts
|-
! tooth
| mokta || bufon || mufon || mufon || bufon(afon) || fon || mefon || ifon || mu(o)fuon
|-
! leg
| mohoti-muʔ || maki || maki || maːki || meyak || ipèk || ikak || igaka || daki
|-
! louse
| kuta || mec || mèːt || mè(i)t(s) || meys || mais || meys || meyds || mèts
|-
! dog
| mehi || mes || mès || mès || mèt(y) || mèyt || mèt ||  || mès
|-
! pig
| hweij || mek || mèk || mèk -ui; mèk-us || mèk || mèk || mèːk ||  || mèk
|-
! bird
| ba || mem || mèm || mèm || mèm || mèm || meːm || mem || mèm
|-
! egg
| moʔwuʔ || ofou || òfeu || afo(i) ofo(i) || mémafu(i) || afeː || efiː || ofug || ofow
|-
! blood
| mokuhi || mugufu || okguwu || m(u)fora || -axof || aguf || agof || ifugwa || oxwofi
|-
! bone
| mori || mofora || acfora || (m)ogu(e) || afar || or || c(a)fon || ikofa || ofora
|-
! skin
| mos || mofos || a(o)wos || muos || menkar || afuots || awuot(y) || mosho || muos
|-
! tree
| sako || merga || mèga || òkàwu(n) || merga || apow || akow || mergowoho || okow
|-
! man
| giji || nuna || dusnok || mona || iːs || isosk || isnok || eris || runa
|-
! sun
| idesi; igda || mowa || mowa || mauwa || mauw || mouw || mauwa || mau || mou
|-
! water
| tohu || mei || mey || mey || miː || mey || miy || mei || mey
|-
! fire
| smow || mowoxo || maːx || maːx || merax || maːx || merax || merah || mèrax
|-
! stone
| idahabu || mamu || mamu || mami || mox(w)om || mekom || maukom || mamo || muosgoni
|-
! name
| moxo || mofoka || dufòkah || mufaka || bou(y)ok || ifap || iwuok || iwoko || buoka
|-
! eat
| eth || etmar || mit || miːt || mièt || mit || menèt || itmar || bitmar
|-
! one
| hom || ergens || èrgèns || èrgèns || èrgèns || afims || arfins || erges || èrgèns
|-
! two
| huay || ergek || ègeka || èrgèk || argak || afik || èrfik || ergak || ergak
|}

See also
Hatam–Mansim languages
West Papuan languages

References

Further reading

External links
East Bird's Head languages database at TransNewGuinea.org

 
Languages of Indonesia
East Bird's Head languages
Western New Guinea